A Sojourn in the City of Amalgamation, in the Year of Our Lord, 19-- is a dystopian novel written by Jerome B. Holgate (1812–93) under the pseudonym of Oliver Bolokitten. It was self-published by the author in New York in February 1835. The novel criticizes abolitionists by describing them as endorsers of "amalgamation", or interracial marriage. The narrator encounters a future city, Amalgamation (which is thought to be a future Philadelphia), where white people and black people have intermarried solely for the sake of racial equality, resulting in "moral degeneration, indolence, and political and economic decline." The work is one of the first uses of a satirical novel, speaking against interracial marriage and for black recolonization. The novel is also one of the earliest pieces of dystopian fiction.

Characters 
 Bolokitten: the narrator and main character of the story
 Wildfire: the preacher of the church of Amalgamation; frees his slaves, but is tarred and feathered by them because it was better to be a slave and cared for than a freedman and starving
 Mr. Hoffle: the white husband of Miss Sincopy; one of the original group of four that wants to be initiated into Amalgamation by way of the Great Boiler; becomes friends with Bolokitten
 Miss Sincopy: the black wife of Mr. Hoffle; one of the original group of four
 Miss Crizy: the black wife of Mr. Dashey; one of the original group of four
 Mr. Dashey: the white husband of Miss Crizy; one of the original group of four; does not have nose hair
 Mr. Sternfast: Bolokitten's friend; father of Julia; married to a white woman and has two white children, but vows that his daughter will marry a black man
 Julia: the daughter of Mr. Sternfast
 Albert: a white man that Julia is in love with; disguises himself as a black man named Wyming in order to marry Julia after George's death
 George Cosho: a black man that Mr. Sternfast wants Julia to marry; killed by military fire in an assumed riot

Summary 
Bolokitten says that "every thing in the world is a cause," and he links these causes to abolitionists and slavery. He sees two white men and two black women disembarking a boat and follows their group to the city of Amalgamation. Bolokitten learns from them that amalgamation is a "fashionable" thing to do in this city. The group goes to a church in which a preacher named Wildfire has sermons about the benefits of amalgamation. There are contraptions placed throughout the pews and attached to people's noses to "protect" the white members from the smell of their black spouses. After the sermon, there is an invitation for those who want to be initiated into the "holy fraternity."Wildfire explains to the group that there are two parts of the process to join: boiling, which will get rid of the prejudice, and perfuming, which will keep it away. During the boiling process, a liquid comes out of the kettle and surrounds the votary, influencing their brains. As the boiling begins, things around the room start to move on their own, and everyone starts to dance as if forced, even the narrator. They then go into the perfuming room, and the women are bound and flogged severely. The women are injected with syringes full of perfume to further purify them, put in a coop that is covered in small holes, and fumigated in an additional boiling process. Wildfire then calls for the probosci, which is a "silver wire… attached to the metallic pilaster above [them]," and clasps the small hook on the end of the wire to Hoffle's nose before drawing the nostrils up. Bolokitten emphasizes the importance of nose hairs before saying that Mr. Dashey has none. Wildfire discovers this and becomes angry, and his tantrum reminds Bolokitten of Jim Crow. The door opens to reveal a tall man in a cloak, with a baton in one hand and a lantern in the other, who demands to know what the noise is, and Wildfire yells at them to leave "lest… [they] be plunged into the Great Boiler."

Bolokitten learns that Sternfast, a white man, has a white wife and two white children, and when Bolokitten asks why he did not amalgamate, Sternfast tells him that, to make up for his transgression, his daughter will marry a black man. 

Bolokitten meets a group of black men in the street one night, and shoots the leader before the rest of the group beat, rob, and kidnap Bolokitten. He is put into a dimly lit room, and through a crack in the floor he sees a crowd of black people surrounding Wildfire, who is seated in an armchair. A man he says he will not harm his "beloved Wildfire," but he wants atonement for the fact that Wildfire freed them, saying that they are not as happy as when they were slaves because they are not provided for anymore. The leader then says to give Wildfire a new coat, and they strip him, cover him in tar, and feather him. They throw him in the cellar with Bolokitten and leave.

Bolokitten and Hoffle come across a building with the inscription: "The Zoological Boiler." They enter a room full of boilers with different animals, all violating the law to "love thy neighbor as thyself." Bolokitten, followed by Hoffle, leaves when the animals being boiled start to scream. 

Julia tells Albert that her father, Sternfast, wants her to marry Mr. George Cosho. Julia assures Albert that she would rather kill herself than do so, but they are soon interrupted by an infuriated Sternfast. Julia flees, but is later visited by George. The pair are joined by Albert, who breaks off his relationship with Julia and asks George to leave. Julia informs Albert of her marriage in three days, and he tells her to instead accept a wedding proposal from a black man named Wyming.

Julia is approached by two black men while in town, and they introduce her to Mr. Wyming. When she tries to leave with her friend Ruth, George, along with a crowd, appears and surrounds her. A group of black men try to talk to Sternfast, but then the military appears, assuming that there is a riot. Wyming grabs Julia to protect her. The military fires just as Julia and Wyming make it to nearby cover, leaving George behind to be shot and killed.

Sternfast tells Wyming that Julia owes him her hand in marriage because he saved her. He then decides to drug his daughter to get her to comply to marrying Wyming, and his wife reluctantly helps him. Wyming and Julia get married, and afterward, Wyming makes her watch him bathe. Julia does not understand why until he washes his face and she recognizes him as Albert in blackface. Julia faints from excitement. The novel ends with the happy couple reunited.

The Memoirs of Boge Bogun 
Between chapter seven and eight of the novel, Bolokitten purchases a book while in the city of Amalgamation and proceeds to read it in full. The full title of this novel is The Memoirs of Boge Bogun with an Account of the War that took Place in his Own Body, Between the Differently Colored Particles of Flesh and the Consequent Result, and its narrative focuses on a mulatto man whose body, due to his racial status, is waging constant war on itself. The two factions of his body, the white and the black, fight their battles throughout the various systems of his body, and the subsection is a direct allegory for the gradually increasing tensions between the Northern United States and Southern United States which would eventually blossom into the American Civil War. It can also be read as the eventual race war that was so feared by white people at the time.

Influence 
Holgate's work is founded in the strong prejudices of the early 19th-century United States. The novel includes a sense of strong racial tension and a fear of miscegenation, which is representative of the time period. The work's intense focus on the olfactory system stems from an idea that white people should be fundamentally repulsed by other "lesser" races. An identical sentiment was expressed by Thomas Jefferson in Notes on the State of Virginia: "[those of African descent] secrete less by the kidneys, and more by the glands of the skin, which gives them a very strong and disagreeable odor." These ideas of racial superiority are often tied to the Great Chain of Being, and there was a fear that interracial unions would "produce convulsions which will probably never end but in the extermination of the one or the other races."

Holgate had strong ties to the anti-abolition movement and advocates the perspectives of the group throughout his novel. Primarily, he labels the criticism/moralizing of the abolitionists as well-meaning but ineffective, and showcases a former slave who was happier during his enslavement. In reference to the first, this could be seen as a counter position to American abolitionism's close ties to the Second Great Awakening. The second example can be classified as a traditional "Uncle Tom" archetype which, in itself, is a reference to Harriet Beecher Stowe's Uncle Tom's Cabin and the submissive relationship the eponymous character has to his white masters.

The novel's basic format is structured similarly to the satirical travel narrative, specifically Gulliver's Travels written by Jonathan Swift (which he quotes at the beginning of the novel). In placing his protagonist, Bolokitten, in a strange place with strange ideals, the author both points towards his own ideas and pokes fun at the supposed absurdity of his opposition's viewpoint.

An article in The Liberator outlined a similar imagined future as the "City of Amalgamation," in which "blacks and whites were mingling with perfect ease in social intercourse." Holgate's city was a racist take on this, as were Edward Williams Clay's anti-amalgamation political cartoons.

Historical context 
In the years leading to the publication of A Sojourn in the City of Amalgamation, racial tensions were rising in the United States. In 1831, Nat Turner led a revolt that led to the death of 51 white people, raising racial tension not only in the southern region, but in the entire country. The fear of future uprisings and bloodshed caused a rise of anti-abolition sentiment in the south. In 1833, the British Parliament enacted the Slavery Abolition Act which was titled "An Act for the Abolition of Slavery throughout the British Colonies; for promoting the Industry of the manumitted Slaves; and for compensating the Persons hitherto entitled to the Services of such Slaves." This act caused tension in the United States with the northern states hoping the country would follow Britain's lead and the southern states fighting against it. Also in 1833, William Lloyd Garrison led the organization of the American Antislavery Society, that, within five years, had 250,000 members. The Philadelphia Female Anti-Slavery Society—an integrated abolitionist group led by Lucretia Mott, Harriet Forten Purvis, and Grace Bustill Douglass—was founded in 1835. Together these and other abolition groups bombarded Congress with antislavery petitions in 1835. The rise in abolitionist activity resulted in anti-abolitionist, or pro-slavery, activity, such as this text.

Themes

Religion 
Holgate makes multiple references to God and the Bible throughout the narrative. Holgate says that The Creator engraved "distinguishing lineaments" on black people and white people, but humans are mixing the two, which the narrator says is a "new invented specie, of which our Creator knows nothing." The author also makes multiple references to the Bible verse that says "love thy neighbor." This passage is also commonly known as the Golden Rule.

The Amalgamation process itself is also presented as a religion. The process takes place in a church, and the followers are offered "initiation into [the] holy fraternity." The followers, or disciples, are also referred to as "proselytes." The boiling process can also be paralleled to Christian baptism, as the new members are bathed in water as a form of rebirth—"by water and the Spirit."

Holgate's inclusion of Biblical quotations and associated practices coincides with the Second Great Awakening. However, the work labels the abolitionists' utilization of Christian rhetoric in their anti-slavery stance as ineffectual. This is a direct poke at the ways in which Northern abolitionists made emancipation a religious issue. There are points in the novel where Holgate claims that mixture is an affront to the Christian God, so there is an implication that Holgate wants to discredit the North from incorporating religion while simultaneously embracing it himself.

Racial mixture 
The concept of racial mixture is the fundamental crux of both the work's central narrative and the in-text novel, Boge Bogun. In the first, the story itself is driven by the city's laws ensuring racial mixture, the inhumane technology that allows for this, and the questions of agency, racial identity, and racial privilege raised by Holgate's world. Boge Bogun—the brief tale of a racially-mixed man whose body is at war with itself over his racial status—provides a narrative in which mixture is both problematic to the collective whole and inherently unhealthy. 

Holgate uses biological differences, specifically scent, in order to explain how race mixture was not natural. Holgate discusses the "foul odour" that he believes black people have throughout the novel, and says that if white people are forced to socialize with black people, then they are putting their health in jeopardy. The odor provokes vomiting in white people, so by consummating their marriage they are causing themselves harm. Holgate also mentions directly, that white people prefer their own race by nature and not by prejudice.

References

External links
Complete edition at Internet Archive
 Online edition (Chapters 2 and 3)

See also

Other works discussing miscegenation or amalgamation 

 "The Quadroons" by Lydia Marie Child
 The Black Vampyre; A Legend of St. Domingo by Uriah Derick D'Arcy
 The Half-Breed: A Tale of the Western Frontier by Walt Whitman
 Of One Blood: Or, The Hidden Self by Pauline Hopkins

1835 American novels
Dystopian novels
1830s science fiction novels
Self-published books
Works published under a pseudonym
Novels set in the 20th century
Novels set in the future